"The Guitar Man" is a song written by David Gates and originally recorded by the rock group Bread. It first appeared on Bread's 1972 album, Guitar Man. It is a mixture of the sounds of soft rock, including strings and acoustic guitar, and the addition of a wah-wah effect electric guitar, played by Larry Knechtel. It peaked at No. 11 on the Billboard Hot 100 chart in the United States and was their third No. 1 hit on the easy listening chart, (following "If" and "Baby I'm-a Want You").

Chart performance

Personnel
David Gates - lead vocals, bass, violin
James Griffin - acoustic guitar, harmony vocals
Larry Knechtel - lead guitar
Mike Botts - drums

Cover versions
The song has been covered by David J on his 2003 album Estranged, Cake on their 2004 album Pressure Chief, Starflyer 59 on their 2007 vinyl collection Ghosts of the Future, and Bobby Bare Jr. on his American Bread EP. Hank Marvin released his album Guitar Man with a cover version of the song.  In 2012 Wreckless Eric and Amy Rigby recorded a version for a fund raising CD titled Super Hits of the Seventies for radio station WFMU. In 2020, The Wild Feathers included a version of the song on their album "Medium Rarities."

See also
List of number-one adult contemporary singles of 1972 (U.S.)

References

1972 singles
Bread (band) songs
Songs written by David Gates
Rock ballads
Songs about music
Songs about musicians
Songs about guitars
1970s ballads
1972 songs
Cake (band) songs
Elektra Records singles